Annibale Saraceni was a Roman Catholic prelate who served as Bishop of Lecce (1560–1591).

Biography
On 29 November 1560, Annibale Saraceni was appointed during the papacy of Pope Pius IV as Bishop of Lecce.
On 15 March 1561, he was consecrated bishop by Giovanni Michele Saraceni, Cardinal-Priest of Sant'Anastasia, with Giovanni Giacomo Barba, Bishop of Terni, and Giulio Galletti, Bishop Emeritus of Alessano, serving as co-consecrators. 
He served as Bishop of Lecce until his resignation in 1591.

References

External links and additional sources
 (for Chronology of Bishops) 
 (for Chronology of Bishops) 

16th-century Italian Roman Catholic bishops
Bishops appointed by Pope Pius IV